This is a list of games for the Bandai WonderSwan Color handheld video game system, organized alphabetically by name. Games for the original WonderSwan also work on the WonderSwan Color, but are listed separately.

The WonderSwan Color has  games.

Cancelled games

Notes

References

External links
WonderSwan Color games (2003)
WonderSwan Color games (2002)
WonderSwan Color games (2001)
WonderSwan Color games (2000)

Japan-exclusive video games
WonderSwan Color